Dawn of the Emperors: Thyatis and Alphatia is an accessory for the Dungeons & Dragons fantasy role-playing game.

Contents
Dawn of the Emperors is a campaign setting in the world of the GAZ series, and describes the two warring empires of Thyatis and Alphatia.

The 32-page "Player's Guide to Thyatis" describes an expanding, eclectic empire reminiscent of the Roman that reserves its highest regard for warriors; this book includes character creation rules for Thyatian player characters.

The 32-page "Player's Guide to Alphatia" describes a chaotic, bizarre, and ancient empire where magic-users reign over all non-magical folk; this book includes rules for Alphatian character creation, and for making magic items.

The 128-page "The Dungeon Master's Sourcebook" includes a history and atlas for each of the two featured empires, plus details of disputed territories, campaign and adventure scenario suggestions, and rules for conversion to AD&D.

Publication history
Dawn of the Emperors - Thyatis and Alphatia was written by Aaron Allston, with a cover by Clyde Caldwell and interior illustrations by Stephen Fabian, and was published by TSR in 1989 as a boxed set containing a 128-page book, two 32-page books, and two large color maps.

Reception
In the January 1990 edition  of Games International (Issue 12), although Steve Jones had some quibbles with several of the rules, he concluded "I was pleasantly surprised by this campaign pack."

In the 1991 book Heroic Worlds: A History and Guide to Role-Playing Games, Lawrence Schick commented, "On the whole, it's a satisfying climax to the GAZ series."

References

Dungeons & Dragons Gazetteers
Mystara
Role-playing game supplements introduced in 1989